is a Japanese anime series animated by Japanese studio Gonzo. The series was created by Junichi Sato, who also directed the first season, and written by Reiko Yoshida. Kaleido Star: New Wings was directed by Yoshimasa Hiraike.

Kaleido Star follows Sora Naegino, a young Japanese girl, who travels to the United States to fulfill her dream of performing at the world-famous Kaleido Stage.

Three original video animations have been produced, as well as a manga series and a novel. Internationally, the first series was aired on Cartoon Network Latin America in 2004.

Plot

First Season
Sora Naegino is a young Japanese girl with great acrobatic talent who travels to Cape Mery (a mix of Los Angeles and San Francisco), California in hopes of auditioning for the Kaleido Stage, a world-famous circus which has mesmerized her since childhood. However, she runs into difficulties as soon as she arrives. She gets lost on her way to the Stage, is leered at by a mysterious stranger, and has her bag stolen by a thief. Employing her acrobatic skills, Sora chases down the criminal.

A kind police officer gives her a ride to Kaleido Stage only to discover she had missed her audition, an event upon which her idol, Layla Hamilton, advises her to return to Japan. However, after a performer is injured, the owner of the circus, Kalos offers her a chance to perform. Sora, humiliated by her failed efforts decides to return to Japan. Kalos, having seen her earlier chase, reconsiders and informs Layla that Sora's performance will eventually be the main act at the circus, earning her reluctant respect.

The other members of Kaleido Stage, particularly Layla, are dissatisfied with Sora. With the help of stage manager Ken Robbins, the performers Mia Guillem and Anna Heart, young Marion Begnini, as well as a lot of hard work and determination, Sora begins to earn the respect of those around her. Her personality eventually earns the respect of the performers as well as several increasingly major roles in the productions. She also befriends Layla over time.

However, Layla's father pressures her to leave and insiders plan to take over and shut down Kaleido Stage. Sora relies on her winning personality, hard work and close friendships to keep the stage afloat.

New Wings
In the second season, Sora returns to the stage after attempting the Legendary Great Maneuver with Layla. This leaves Layla's shoulder injured and unable to perform. The absence of her co-star, having retired to further a career in Broadway productions, prompts a slight decline of the Kaleido Stage. Because of this Kalos brings in a new recruit, Leon Oswald (a lofty trapeze artist). It seems at first that Leon is reminded very much of someone due to Sora's presence, and at times this causes him to either be really rude or really sweet to Sora.

Despite this, however, Leon disapproves Sora as worthy of being on the stage with him. This leads to the most talented of the new Kaleido Stage recruits, the Chinese-American May Wong (who is also an ex-figure skater) to question and challenge Sora's position as Leon's partner and star of the show. After a very ugly incident, however, May begins to question herself and her goals.

Sora's first goal in the season is to attend the circus festival in Paris, but the competitors will do anything to attain the title of 'festival winner': betray, deceive, or even attack their opposers. The atmosphere and attitude this creates does not bode kindly to Sora's carefree, optimistic, ultra-idealistic outlook. It, in turn, causes her to withdraw from the competition in the middle of her act (or the Angel Act) with the redeemed Yuri Killian, leaving her friends, family and Layla confused and otherwise disappointed with Sora.

Most of the season concentrates on Sora finding, questioning, and pursuing new dreams. After many trials and rejections, Sora eventually aims to become a "True Kaleido Star" while creating a fun, conflict-free stage, the complete opposite of what she experiences at the festival in Paris.

The Amazing Princess Without a Smile
The first OVA looks at a new production in the works that follows the Kaleido Stage's success with Swan Lake, about a female princess that is unable to smile and a jester of hers that is hoping to bring her smile back. The idea for the production came to Mia from a painting that featured a character that looked very similar to Rosetta and a jester in the background that looked surprisingly like Fool (the stage spirit that can be seen only by very talented students).

Rosetta is assigned the lead role as the princess. Unfortunately, despite the likeliness of her being able to comprehend the role fully as she herself never carried a smile when she first came to Kaleido Stage, she has difficulties acting out the part and leaves the rehearsals mid-way frustrated. Will Rosetta be able to play the role right? What ties does Fool have with the painting of the princess and the jester?

Legend of Phoenix ~Layla Hamilton Monogatari~
Layla and Sora are about to launch different interpretations of the same show "Legend of Phoenix" on opposite coasts. Layla is preparing at the Broadway but is dissatisfied with her performance. She feels that she cannot perform the role properly if she is not truly reborn as a new Layla Hamilton. In a desperate attempt to be reborn, Layla runs off on a solo bicycle trip to upstate New York in hopes of rediscovering herself.

Meanwhile, Sora is also attempting to find her own Phoenix, but when she learns of Layla's disappearance she, Ken and May run off to New York to find the former Kaleido Star who at that instant was on a bike journey with no set destination.

Layla meets various strangers and reminisces memories of her childhood along the way as she thinks of how she can change herself. But while she tries to find a new self, she spends her entire time alone thinking about Sora until she comes to realize just how much Sora has been a muse to her. Once she realizes that, she is reborn. The nature of this revelation, though speculated in different ways by various fans, is up to interpretation. During the end credits, we are shown two different Phoenixes.

Good da yo! Goood!!
Good da yo! Goood!! is a 22 minutes OVA that is rendered by computer graphics. All of the characters are presented super deformed. The OVA is split up into three parts. The first part is a lesson in Chinese cooking presented by May Wong; the dish that is presented is mapo doufu. The second part is a lesson on how to use the diabolo by Rosetta Passel. The final part is a lesson in seal lingo presented by Marion and Jonathan to Sora.

Media

Episodes

Music
Opening
1 Take it, Shake it – Sugar (Episodes 1-13)
 Lyrics: Kyoko Asakura
 Music: So Kikuchi
 Arrangement: Shinichiro Murayama
 Music: Production: Hori Pro Inc.
2 Yakusoku no Basho he – Chihiro Yonekura (Episodes 14-26)
 Lyrics: Chinhiro Yonekura
 Music Chinhiro Yonekura
3 "Tattoo Kiss" by r.o.r/s (Episodes 27–51)
 Lyrics: Mizue Takada
 Music: Dream Field
 Arrangement: Keiji Tanabe
4 "Blanc et Noir" by Ryō Hirohashi and Kaori Mizuhashi (The Amazing Princess Without a Smile OVA)

5 "Ray of Light" by Sayaka Ōhara (Legend of Phoenix ~Layla Hamilton Monogatari~ OVA)
 Lyrics: Yuki Matsuura
 Music: Mina Kubota
 Arrangement: Yuki Matsuura

Ending
1 Real Identity – Sugar (Episodes 1–13)
 Lyrics: Kyoko Asakura
 Music: Satori Shiraishi
 Arrangement: Shinichiro
2 Bokuwa Kokoni IRU – Sophia (Episodes 14-26)
 Lyrics: Mitsuru Matsuoka
 Music: Mitsuru Matsuoka
 (Toy's Factory)
 "Escape" by r.o.r/s (Episodes 27–50)
 Lyrics: Mizue Takada
 Music: Keiji Tanabe
 Arrangement: Kenji Tanabe
  by Chihiro Yonekura with Kaleido Stars (Episode 51)
 "Tattoo Kiss" by r.o.r/s (The Amazing Princess Without a Smile OVA)
  by Sayaka Ōhara (Legend of Phoenix ~Layla Hamilton Monogatari~ OVA)
 Lyrics: Kaleido Stage
 Music: Hitoshi Sakimoto
 Arrangement: Hitoshi Sakimoto

Insert
 "Ray of Light" by Layla Hamilton (Sayaka Ōhara) (Episode 50)
 Music: Mina Kubota
 Lyrics: Yuki Matsuura

Manga
A manga entitled Kaleido Star ~Wings of the Future~ began serialization in Shōnen Fang's April issue and was released on February 19, 2007. The story takes place fifteen years after the events of the anime series and it revolves around Sora's younger sister, Yume. Because Sora has not visited her family in years for reasons unknown, Yume joins Kaleido Stage in hopes to meet her.

Various new characters have been introduced, old ones have also come back including Yuri Killian, May Wong, Ken Robbins, Marion Benigni, Mia Guillem, Rosetta Passel, Jonathan and Jean Benigni.

Serialization in Shōnen Fang magazine ended in September 2007 when the magazine went defunct.

Novel
A novel named  was released on February 10, 2006.

Reception
Kaleido Star was generally well received by critics, with the majority of acclaim paid to the first season.

Season 1
In a review of the first Volume, Anime News Network called the series "heartwarming fluff without too many sugar calories" and praised the Japanese voice cast for stellar performances, with particular emphasis on Ryo Hirohashi and Takehito Koyasu. Anime On DVD also noted Koyasu's performance, the quality of the animation in the performance scenes, and the fulfilling climax of the final episode. Mike Lewis of Underland Online noted Kaleido Star as being "...an extraordinary series is in a class all its own."

Season 2
Despite being put off by the recap episodes, Anime News Network positively reviewed the first Volume of Kaleido Star: New Wings. While critiquing the story as "straight from the shōjo drama playbook," the review held praise for the visuals, stating that "the best thing about Kaleido Star is, far and away, the amazing animation and production values. The circus scenes are wildly original and sometimes breathtaking; the animation quality hasn't dipped at all in the second season." Cynthia Martinez also won notice for developing her performance as Sora. Anime Advanced also looked at the first volume and praised it highly, noting that "Kaleido Star gets my highest possible recommendation. This is a show that dreams are made of."

Summing up the series, Chris Beveridge of Anime On DVD said that "Kaleido Star has been a great series overall with a somewhat weak second season that really took its time to find its own voice," but that "it's still a series that's very easy to recommend on a whole and one that is very much worth showing to a younger audience." ActiveAnime's Holly Ellingwood commented that "The finale is climatic and fulfilling." and summarized the series as being "An anime that is a pure joy to watch. Exhilarating, Kaleido Star is a stirring series that is both inspirational and remarkable."

Extra Stage
Anime On DVD proclaimed the OVA to be "a beautiful piece of work and the best way to close out things for a while as it is much more oriented on the comedy and the lighter side of the characters... It's a great little self-contained story that plays strong in a similar fashion to the last episode of the series but without quite so much angst and hardship associated with it. It leaves you laughing and really smiling at the end of the disc."

References

Further reading

External links

Gonzo site
ADV Films site
Funimation site

2003 anime television series debuts
2004 anime OVAs
2005 anime OVAs
2006 anime OVAs
ADV Films
Anime with original screenplays
Drama anime and manga
Circus films
Circus television shows
Funimation
Gonzo (company)
Shōnen manga
Sports anime and manga
TV Tokyo original programming